TFL may refer to:

 Tackle for loss, a gridiron football defensive play
 Tasmanian Football League, Australian rules football competition
 Tensor fasciae latae muscle, thigh/hip muscle
 Terry Fox Laboratory, the major research unit of the BC Cancer Agency
 Thermally fused laminate, a resin-saturated layer heat-fused to a substrate that was previously referred to as Thermally Fused Melamine (TFM)
 Transient friction loading, the mechanical stress induced on an object due to transient or vibrational frictional forces
 Transport for London (TfL), public transport body for Greater London
 Trees for Life, separate non-profit organizations:
 Trees For Life (Australia)
 Trees for Life (Scotland)
 Trees for Life (United States)
 Tyskarna från Lund, Swedish synthpop band
 True forced loneliness, inceldom
 TFL, ICAO code for TUI fly Netherlands